Achau is a town in the district of Mödling in the Austrian state of Lower Austria.

History
After the Anschluss in 1938, Achau became a part of Greater Vienna, but returned to Lower Austria after the war.

Population

Sport
The Achau golf course is one of the few in the area serving the local Mödling population.

References

Cities and towns in Mödling District